The National Liberal Party (RVP) was a political party in Estonia.

History
The party was established by Johan Pitka in 1922 and ran in the 1923 parliamentary elections, winning four seats with 4.5% of the vote. The 1926 elections saw its vote share fall to just 0.9%, and the party lost all four seats. It did not contest elections again.

References

Defunct political parties in Estonia